Marabe is a surname. Notable people with the surname include:

Larsen Marabe (born 1986), Papua New Guinean rugby league footballer
Litsepe Marabe (born 1992), Lesotho footballer
Mokone Marabe (born 1990), Lesotho footballer

Surnames of African origin